Aravinda Chakravarti (born 6 February 1954, Calcutta) is a human geneticist and expert in computational biology, and Director of the Center For Human Genetics & Genomics at New York University. He was the 2008 President of the American Society of Human Genetics.
Chakravarti became a co-Editor-in-Chief of the journal Genome Research in 1995, and of the ''Annual Review of Genomics and Human Genetics' in 2005.

Early life and education
Aravinda Chakravarti was born in Calcutta in 1954, his family's third son. Their childhood revolved around the importance of education, and he attended the Calcutta Boys' School (CBS).

Chakravarti received his Bachelor of Statistics in 1974 from the Indian Statistical Institute in Calcutta.  He moved to the United States, where he studied with Masatoshi Nei,  receiving his PhD in human genetics from the University of Texas Health Science Center at Houston in 1979. 
Chakravarti took a postdoctoral position at the University of Washington in Seattle  until 1980.

Career
Chakravarti was a member of the Department of Human Genetics at the University of Pittsburgh from 1980 – 1993. In 1994 he joined the faculty of Case Western Reserve University as the James H. Jewell Professor of Genetics.

In 2000, Chakravarti joined the Johns Hopkins University School of Medicine as the Henry J. Knott Professor and the inaugural Director of the McKusick-Nathans Institute of Genetic Medicine at Johns Hopkins. From 2007-2018 he served as director of the Center for Complex Disease Genomics at Johns Hopkins.

Chakravarti became director of the Center For Human Genetics & Genomics at New York University on 2 April 2, 2018.

Research
Chakravarti has made contributions to human genetics in areas including population, statistical genetics, and the genetics of complex disease. He has developed important genomics methods that are now used worldwide, such as linkage disequilibrium mapping, His research has contributed to  understanding linkage disequilibrium and genetic variation.  He has combined population genetics and genomic technology to effectively address problems in medical genetics.

Chakravarti helped to identify the genetic mutation involved in cystic fibrosis and discovered a genetic variant related to autism. His methods have been used to identify recombination hotspots in hemoglobinopathies. Chakravarti also studies sudden cardiac death.

His team has studied Hirschsprung disease (HSCR) and determined the key genes and non-coding mutations responsible, demonstrating that the disease is caused by mutations of multiple genes. HSCR is now considered a model for the study of complex disease, in part due to Chakravarti's development of experimental techniques. This research may help researchers to better understand complex diseases such as schizophrenia and autism.

Chakravarti has  been influential in genetics research projects including the Human Genome Project, 1000 Genomes and HapMap.  As a member of the advisory council of the National Human Genome Research Institute,  Chakravarti chaired the Human Genome Project from 1997 to 2000. He was involved in designing the population genetics sampling plan for the 1000 Genomes Project.

Awards
 2018, Chen Award, Human Genome Organization (HUGO)
 2015, Member, National Academy of Sciences
 2014, Member, American Association for the Advancement of Science  
 2013, William Allan Award, American Society of Human Genetics: This award is given out each year to a scientist who has made substantial contributions to understanding human genetics.
 2008, Member, Indian Academy of Sciences
 2007, Member, US National Academy of Medicine

Gallery

References 

1954 births
Living people
American geneticists
Scientists from Kolkata
University of Texas Health Science Center at Houston alumni
University of Pittsburgh faculty
Case Western Reserve University faculty
Johns Hopkins University faculty
Annual Reviews (publisher) editors
Members of the National Academy of Medicine